The 2010–11 Serie A1 is the 66th season of Italian Championship (Italian Volleyball League) organized under the supervision of Federazione Italiana Pallavolo.

Teams

Champions
Italian Championship A1: Itas Diatec Trentino
Italian Cup A1: Bre Banca Lannutti Cuneo
Italian Supercup A1: Bre Banca Lannutti Cuneo

European cups qualification
2011–12 CEV Champions League (3): Itas Diatec Trentino, Bre Banca Lannutti Cuneo, Lube Banca Marche Macerata
2011–12 CEV Cup (1): Acqua Paradiso Monza Brianza
2011–12 CEV Challenge Cup (1): Casa Modena

Italian supercup A1
Venue: PalaRuffini, Turin, Piedmont

|}

Italian cup A1

Regular season 1st half

|}

Final round

Quarterfinals

|}

Semifinals
Venue: PalaOlimpia, Verona, Veneto

|}

Final
Venue: PalaOlimpia, Verona, Veneto

|}

Italian championship A1

Regular season

|}

Playoffs

Quarterfinals

Itas Diatec Trentino (1) 3:0 RPA LuigiBacchi.it San Giustino (8)

|}

Casa Modena (5) 3:2 Acqua Paradiso Monza Brianza (4)

|}

Bre Banca Lannutti Cuneo (2) 3:0 Marmi Lanza Verona (7)

|}

Lube Banca Marche Macerata (3) 3:2 Sisley Treviso (6)

|}

Semifinals

Itas Diatec Trentino (1) 3:2 Casa Modena (5)

|}

Bre Banca Lannutti Cuneo (2) 3:2 Lube Banca Marche Macerata (3)

|}

Final

Itas Diatec Trentino (1) 1:0 Bre Banca Lannutti Cuneo (2)
Venue: PalaLottomatica, Rome, Lazio

|}

External links
Official website

Men's volleyball competitions in Italy
2010 in Italian sport
2011 in Italian sport